The Ministry of Culture and Fine Arts (MCFA; ,) is the government ministry with a mandate to promote, encourage and support the fine arts of Cambodia.

See also
 Culture of Cambodia
 Government of Cambodia

External links
Ministry of Fine Arts

Government ministries of Cambodia
Cambodian culture
Cambodia
Phnom Penh
Ministries established in 1997
1997 establishments in Cambodia